Richard McMichael (c. 1788 - c. 1843) was an American politician from New York.

Life
He was the son of James McMichael (1752–1828) and Maria (Hall) McMichael. On December 13, 1812, he married Maria Marselis (1795–1854), and they had eight children.

He was a member of the New York State Assembly (Schenectady Co.) in 1820-21.

He was a member of the New York State Senate (3rd D.) from 1825 to 1828, sitting in the 48th, 49th, 50th and 51st New York State Legislatures.

Sources
The New York Civil List compiled by Franklin Benjamin Hough (pages 126f, 143, 197 and 290; Weed, Parsons and Co., 1858)
Contributions for the Genealogies of the Descendants of the First Settlers of the patent and City of Schenectady from 1662 to 1800 by Jonathan Pearson (Albany, 1873; reprinted 1998; pg. 112 and 117)
Cemetery transcriptions at Schenectady History [says "died 1843, aged 55 years"]

1780s births
1840s deaths
People from Schenectady County, New York
New York (state) state senators
Members of the New York State Assembly
New York (state) Democratic-Republicans
19th-century American politicians